, provisional designation: , is a sizable centaur and retrograde damocloid from the outer Solar System, approximately  in diameter. It was discovered on 18 December 2008, by astronomers with the Siding Spring Survey at the Siding Spring Observatory in Australia. The minor planet was numbered in 2012 and has since not been named.

Orbit and classification 

 orbits the Sun at a distance of 6.5–16.7 AU once every 39 years and 5 months (14,399 days; semi-major axis of 11.58 AU). Its orbit has an eccentricity of 0.44 and an inclination of 105° with respect to the ecliptic. The body's observation arc begins with its official discovery observation at Siding Spring in December 2008.

Retrograde centaur and damocloid 

 is a member of the centaurs, a population of inward-moving bodies transiting from the Kuiper belt to the group of Jupiter-family comets. Orbiting mainly between Jupiter and Neptune, they typically have a semi-major axis of 5.5 to 30.1 AU. Centaurs are cometary-like bodies with an eccentric orbit. Their short dynamical lifetime is due to the perturbing forces exerted on them by the outer planets of the Solar System.

The object is on a retrograde orbit as it has an inclination of more than 90°. The object also meets the orbital definition for being a damocloid. This is a small group of cometary-like objects without a coma or tail and a Tisserand's parameter with respect to Jupiter of less than 2 besides a retrograde orbit.

Numbering and naming 

This minor planet was numbered by the Minor Planet Center on 29 October 2012, receiving the number  in the minor planet catalog . , it has not been named. According to the established naming conventions, it will be named after one of the many centaurs from Greek mythology, which are creatures with the upper body of a human and the lower body and legs of a horse.

Physical characteristics 

 has an intermediate BR color, in between the BB ("grey-blue") and RR ("very red") color classes. Sheppard's obtained color indices: B–I (1.750), B–R (1.260), R–I (0.490) and V–R (0.460) agree with most other centaurs. The resulting B–V index is 0.8 (subtracting V–R from B–R).

Diameter and albedo 

According to the survey of centaurs and scattered-disc objects carried out by the NEOWISE mission of NASA's Wide-field Infrared Survey Explorer,  measures  in diameter and its surface has an albedo of 0.062, which makes it too small to be considered as a dwarf-planet candidate.

Rotation period 

, no rotational lightcurve of has been obtained from photometric observations. The body's rotation period, pole and shape remain unknown.

See also

References

External links 
 List Of Centaurs and Scattered-Disk Objects, Minor Planet Center
 
 

342842
342842
342842
20081218
Minor planets with a retrograde orbit